OVV can refer to:

 OVV quasar
 Orient Air (ICAO airline code OVV), Syrian airline; see List of airline codes (O)
 Ovintiv (stock ticker: OVV), hydrocarbon exploration company
 Dutch Safety Board (OVV)
  (OVV)
  (OVV), a soccer club
  (ÖVV) 
 Venezuelan Violence Observatory (OVV), see Crime in Venezuela
 Order of Vittorio Veneto (O.V.V.), see List of post-nominal letters (Italy)

See also

 O2V (disambiguation)
 OV2 (disambiguation)
 OW (disambiguation)
 OOV (disambiguation)
 OV (disambiguation)